George L Wilson (1903 - date of death unknown), was a South African international lawn bowler.

Bowls career
He won a gold medal in the fours at the 1954 British Empire and Commonwealth Games in Vancouver, with Frank Mitchell, Wilfred Randall and John Anderson.

Personal life
He was an engineer by trade.

References

1903 births
Date of death unknown
Bowls players at the 1954 British Empire and Commonwealth Games
South African male bowls players
Commonwealth Games gold medallists for South Africa
Commonwealth Games medallists in lawn bowls
Medallists at the 1954 British Empire and Commonwealth Games